Jay Reedy is an American politician, farmer, and locksmith from the state of Tennessee. A Republican, Reedy has represented the 74th district of the Tennessee House of Representatives, covering Houston, Humphreys, and Montgomery Counties, since 2015.

Career
Prior to being elected to office, Reedy held a number of jobs, including cattle farmer, locksmith, army reserve officer, and Houston County election board commissioner.

In 2014, Reedy ran for the 74th district of the Tennessee House of Representatives, challenging Democratic incumbent John Tidwell, who had held the seat since 1997. After handily winning the Republican primary, Reedy narrowly defeated Tidwell in the general election with 52% of the vote.

Reedy won re-election in 2016 and 2018 with increasingly dominant margins, and faces no opposition whatsoever in 2020. In 2019, Reedy vied to replace Glen Casada as Speaker of the House, but lost in an intra-caucus vote to fellow Republican Cameron Sexton.

Personal life
Reedy lives in Erin with his wife Vickie; they have 3 children.

References

Living people
Republican Party members of the Tennessee House of Representatives
21st-century American politicians
Year of birth missing (living people)
Austin Peay State University alumni
People from Houston County, Tennessee